Songs We Should Have Written is a cover album by Firewater, released in 2004 through Jetset Records.

Track listing

Personnel 
Firewater
Tod Ashley – vocals, bass guitar, Mellotron, production, design
Oren Kaplan – guitar
Al Jenkins - guitar
Tamir Muskat – drums, loops, Mellotron, B-3 organ, production, mixing
Additional musicians and production
Doug Henderson – recording on "This Little Light of Mine"
George Javori – drums on "This Little Light of Mine"
Emily Lazar – mastering
Ramesh Mishra – sārangī on "Paint It Black"
Britta Phillips – vocals on "The Beat Goes On" and "Some Velvet Morning"
Asaf Roth – marimba on "Diamonds and Gold"
Vijaykumar Sant – sitar on "Paint It Black"
Pandit Sharda – tabla on "Paint It Black"
Dan Shatsky – mixing
Steve Ulrich – steel guitar on "Folsom Prison Blues" and "This Little Light of Mine"
Paul Wallfisch – organ, piano
Zef – cello on "Diamonds and Gold"

References

2004 albums
Covers albums
Firewater (band) albums
Jetset Records albums